"Honesty" is the second and final single from English singer-songwriter Alex Parks' second album, and is the title track. It was released as a single on 23 January 2006. Despite hopes that it would revive interest in the album, it received little promotion or distribution and peaked at number 56 on the UK Singles Chart.

Music video
In the music video, Parks' car seems to have broken down, so she hitches a ride in a hippy van, and then walks to a house by the beach to perform the last chorus of the song.

Track listing
 "Honesty"
 "Black & White"
 "Just Love"

References

External links
 UKMIX – HONESTY single review

2005 songs
2006 singles
Alex Parks songs
Polydor Records singles
Songs written by Alex Parks
Songs written by Judie Tzuke